Chermoshnoy is a rural locality (a settlement) and the administrative center of Baninsky Selsoviet Rural Settlement, Fatezhsky District, Kursk Oblast, Russia. Population:

Geography 
The settlement is located in the Usozha River basin (a left tributary of the Svapa in the basin of the Seym), 104 km from the Russia–Ukraine border, 49 km north-west of Kursk, 4 km north of the district center – the town Fatezh.

 Climate
Chermoshnoy has a warm-summer humid continental climate (Dfb in the Köppen climate classification).

Transport 
Chermoshnoy is located on the federal route  Crimea Highway as part of the European route E105, 3 km from the road of regional importance  (Fatezh – Dmitriyev), on the road of intermunicipal significance  (M2 "Crimea Highway" – 1st Banino), 30 km from the nearest railway station Vozy (railway line Oryol – Kursk).

The rural locality is situated 51 km from Kursk Vostochny Airport, 170 km from Belgorod International Airport and 235 km from Voronezh Peter the Great Airport.

References

Notes

Sources

Rural localities in Fatezhsky District